Supersonic Racers (Dare Devil Derby 3D in North America and Japan) is a racing video game developed by Supersonic Software and published by Mindscape, Inc. for the PlayStation.

Reception
The game received an average score of 76.25% at GameRankings, based on an aggregate of 4 reviews. Jeff Kitts wrote in GameSpot, "While ... Dare Devil Derby for the Playstation may not be a photorealistic, pedal-to-the-metal speedfest ... the variety of tracks and racing environments are enough to give it long term replay value." He praised the inventiveness of the tracks. Scary Larry of GamePro was also pleased with the track design but summarized the game as "a fun, addictive game that's plagued with hard-to-grasp controls."

References

External links

1996 video games
PlayStation (console) games
PlayStation (console)-only games
Racing video games
Video games scored by Mark Knight
Video games developed in the United Kingdom
Mindscape games
Supersonic Software games
Multiplayer and single-player video games